Tamarine Tanasugarn was the defending champion, but lost in the semifinals to Maria Kirilenko.

In the final, Nicole Pratt defeated Kirilenko 7–6(7–3), 6–1 to win her title.

Seeds

Draw

Finals

Top half

Bottom half

References

 Draws

2004 WTA Tour
Bangalore Open